Cais is a surname. Notable people with the surname include:

 Davide Cais (born 1994), Italian footballer
  (1878–1950), Czech Roman Catholic priest
 Michel Cais, pilot-in-training
  (born 1974), Czech artist and musician